The Altamachi River is a river in Bolivia. It flows through the Ayopaya Province and the Chapare Province of the Cochabamba Department.

See also
List of rivers of Bolivia

References
Rand McNally, The New International Atlas, 1993.

Rivers of Cochabamba Department